Colin Charles Houghton Davis (29 July 1933 – 19 December 2012) was a British racing driver from England, who won the 1964 Targa Florio.

Early life
Davis was born in Marylebone, London, the son of "Bentley Boy" and Le Mans winner, Sammy Davis (who later became Autocar magazine's sports editor).

Davis was an advertising executive who raced a 500cc Formula 3 Cooper before moving to Italy from where he conducted his own racing career.

Racing career
Davis competed in two World Championship Formula One Grands Prix, finishing 11th in the 1959 Italian Grand Prix in a Scuderia Centro Sud Cooper-Maserati. He also participated in several non-Championship Formula One races.

Davis finished eighth overall and a class winner in the 1960 Nürburgring 1000km, sharing a Ferrari 250GT with Carlo Abate. In the same race the following year he finished fourth overall, again with Abate, in a Ferrari 250GT. Also in 1961 Davis finished fifth in the 4-Hours of Pescara, driving solo in a 1,600 c.c. Osca Sport.  He shared the winning Porsche 904 GTS in the 1964 Targa Florio with Antonio Pucci.

Later life
After Davis retired from racing, he emigrated to Cape Town and worked as a radio broadcaster. He died on 19 December 2012 after a long illness.

Racing record

Complete Formula One World Championship results 
(key)

Complete 24 Hours of Le Mans results

Complete 12 Hours of Sebring results

See also
 1966 24 Hours of Le Mans
 O.S.C.A.
 S. C. H. "Sammy" Davis

References

Profile at grandprix.com

External links
Colin Davis profile at The 500 Owners Association

English racing drivers
English Formula One drivers
Scuderia Centro Sud Formula One drivers
24 Hours of Le Mans drivers
12 Hours of Reims drivers
World Sportscar Championship drivers
1933 births
2012 deaths
Porsche Motorsports drivers